Committee for operative management of national economy of the Soviet Union was the official name for the provisional office of state administration of the Soviet Union with government functions following dismissal of the Cabinet of Ministers of the Soviet Union on 28 August 1991.

The former government of Valentin Pavlov was dissolved following the failed August Coup against Mikhail Gorbachev and his supporters. Ivan Silayev, who had been appointed chairman of the newly formed committee on 24 August with the task of finding a new government, was instead granted on 28 August the authority of the dissolved cabinet of ministers and de facto the office of the Premier. The dissolution of the committee had been declared by Russian President Boris Yeltsin through presidential decree on 19 December (without confirmation by Soviet President Gorbachev), the deputy chairs retired on that day, but the chair and ministers continued to work until the resignation of President Gorbachev on 25 December.

On 5 September 1991 the Inter-Republican Economic Committee of the USSR (headed by Silayev also) was established as an additional, more important and powerful body and was on 14 November transformed into the Interstate Economic Committee of the Economic Community, a body which sought to become an international body tasked with coordinating the economies of the remaining and former Soviet republics. Yet, the national Soviet Committee for operative management continued to work alongside the Inter-Republican/Interstate Committee and function as the nation's government until the dissolution of the Soviet Union.

Ministries

Committees

References 

 General

Government of the Soviet Union > List
 

Soviet governments
1991 establishments in the Soviet Union
1991 disestablishments in the Soviet Union